Big Mo T is a Dutch mixed martial artist who competed in the Heavyweight division.

Mixed martial arts record

|-
| Win
| align=center| 2-3
| Glenn Brasdorp
| DQ
| Rings Holland: Di Capo Di Tutti Capi
| 
| align=center| 1
| align=center| 1:23
| Utrecht, Netherlands
| 
|-
| Loss
| align=center| 1-3
| Rob van Esdonk
| TKO (knee to the body)
| Rings Holland: There Can Only Be One Champion
| 
| align=center| 1
| align=center| 4:58
| Utrecht, Netherlands
| 
|-
| Win
| align=center| 1-2
| Sander MacKilljan
| KO (punch)
| Rings Holland: The Kings of the Magic Ring
| 
| align=center| 1
| align=center| 1:39
| Utrecht, Netherlands
| 
|-
| Loss
| align=center| 0-2
| Gilbert Yvel
| KO (flying knee)
| Rings Holland: Judgement Day
| 
| align=center| 1
| align=center| 1:59
| Amsterdam, North Holland, Netherlands
| 
|-
| Loss
| align=center| 0-1
| Bob Schrijber
| KO
| FFH: Free Fight Gala
| 
| align=center| 0
| align=center| 0:00
| Beverwijk, North Holland, Netherlands
|

See also
List of male mixed martial artists

References

Dutch male mixed martial artists
Living people
Place of birth missing (living people)
Year of birth missing (living people)